Cortegana  is a town and municipality located in the province of Huelva, Spain. According to the 2005 census, the city has a population of 4,952 inhabitants.

Localities
 

Puerto Lucia

References

External links
Cortegana - Sistema de Información Multiterritorial de Andalucía
Información sobre la Sierra de Aracena

Municipalities in the Province of Huelva